Saint-Privat-des-Prés is a former commune in the Dordogne department in Nouvelle-Aquitaine in southwestern France. On 1 January 2017, it was merged into the new commune Saint Privat en Périgord. The operetta composer Pascal Bastia (1908–2007) died in Saint-Privat-des-Près.

Population

See also
Communes of the Dordogne department

References

Former communes of Dordogne